Route 13 is a national route of Uruguay. In 1983, it was assigned the name Bartolomé Hidalgo. It begins near  Aiguá and joins Route 15 near Velazquez.

References

Roads in Uruguay